Johann Karl Robert Weißbach (1841–1905) was a German architect and Professor.

Life and work 
After graduating from secondary school, he completed an apprenticeship in the building trade, while attending the local Baugewerkschule (Building School). Following that, he spent some time working in the studios of Bernhard Krüger (1821-1881), the Court Architect. He completed his studies at the Dresden Academy of Fine Arts with Georg Hermann Nicolai. In 1863, he was awarded an academic travel grant, which he used to visit Italy and study Renaissance architecture.

In 1867, he returned to Dresden and worked as a building manager for his former teacher, Nicolai, during the construction of the "" (which was destroyed in World War II). After that, he became a Professor at the Academy, but gave up the position in 1875, when the Ministry of Culture prescribed a curriculum with which he did not agree. He then worked as a teacher in the structural engineering department at the Royal Polytechnic; the precursor of today's Dresden University of Technology (TU Dresden).

In addition to his teaching activities, and the occasional official assignment, he often worked independently. His official students included  and, for a few months, Ernst Ludwig Kirchner.

His name was later placed on a memorial there, dedicated to the professors of TU Dresden.

During the construction of the Moltke Quarter in Essen (1908), a street was named after him. There is also a street that bears his name in Dresden's  district.

Sources 
 R. K.: "Karl Weißbach" (obituary), In: Deutsche Bauzeitung, #39, 1905, pp.355–358.
 Volker Helas: Architektur in Dresden 1800–1900. 3rd ed., Verlag der Kunst, 1991, pg.200 ff.

External links 

 
 

1841 births
1905 deaths
Architects from Dresden
Academic staff of the Dresden Academy of Fine Arts